The Basement is a 2017 American horror film directed by Brian M. Conley and Nathan Ives. The film stars Mischa Barton, Jackson Davis, Cayleb Long and Tracie Thoms. The film premiered at Shriekfest in Los Angeles on October 7, 2017. It received a 10 market theatrical and digital release in the United States on 15 September  2018.

Plot 
A deranged serial killer known as Bill Anderson (or "The Gemini") tortures and slays his victims in the basement of his San Fernando Valley home.

Craig Owen (Long), a famous guitarist, goes to the convenience store when his wife, Kelly, asks him to get more champagne. While out, Craig receives two seductive text messages from a woman named Bianca, which he promptly deletes. He is kidnapped in the parking lot. Bill tortures him throughout the night by cutting off his fingers, knocking out his teeth (and forcing Craig to chew and swallow them at one point), and pretending to be various characters in a bizarre drama, including a clown, a police officer, a detective, a prisoner, a doctor, a lawyer, a father, a mother, and a prison guard. The mother gives Craig a nail file, which he uses to cut through his restraints while Gemini eats upstairs. Craig frees himself and escapes the basement, only to be recaptured. He wakes to Bill dressed as a priest who makes him confess and take communion before carving the Gemini zodiac symbol into Craig's forehead. Bill returns dressed as an executioner and waits for 6:00 AM. Eventually, he decapitates Craig with a blowtorch.

Meanwhile, Craig's wife Kelly invites her best friend Bianca over to discuss where Craig might be. Kelly reveals to Bianca that Craig is having an affair and wants to kill whoever it could be. Bianca stays the night and falls asleep on the sofa after Kelly drugs her.

In the morning, Bill arrives at the house dressed as a police officer. He assures her that he killed Craig. Kelly points to Bianca and tells Gemini to 'take out the trash'.

In the last few minutes, a flashback set one month earlier reveals that Bill and Kelly are twins, and she knows all about his killing spree. She also knows that Craig is having an affair with Bianca and asks Bill to kill Craig.

Cast 
 Mischa Barton as Kelly Owen
 Jackson Davis as Bill Anderson
 Cayleb Long as Craig Owen
 Tracie Thoms as Lauren
 Bailey Anne Borders as Bianca
 Kareem J. Grimes as Andre
 Sarah Nicklin as Reporter Amanda Kincaid
 Maria Volk as Allison Perry
 Jessica Sonneborn as Carlee
 Christa Conley as Mia

Production
Conley and Ives wrote the script together in the fall of 2015 and they were inspired by films such as Sleuth, Seven and The Silence of the Lambs''.

Critical reception
On Rotten Tomatoes, the film has an approval rating of 11% based on 9 reviews, with an average score of 3.43/10.

Dread Central gave the film 5 stars out of 5, remarking on its "solid script" and praising the "stellar lead performances" of Davis and Long. The website was also complimentary about the film's production values: "DP Kenneth Stipe has done a lot of TV, but here his lighting and composition are truly cinematic. The music is from another hardworking television veteran, Aaron J. Goldstein, whose sounds underscore the tension and few moments of comedy quite nicely. When it comes to the grue and gore – much of it cringe-inducing – kudos go to Julia Hapney and her team."

References

External links
 Official website
 

2017 films
2017 horror films
American splatter films
2010s English-language films
2010s American films